Festuca circinata is a species of grass in the family Poaceae. This species is native to Argentina Northeast and Northwest, and prefers temperate biomes. This species was first described in 1879.

References  

circinata